The Secretary of State was one of the senior ministers of the Jacobite court in exile following the Glorious Revolution of 1688. 

In common with Jacobite attempts to create a shadow court in exile that matched of that in London, the role was based on the British position of Secretary of State. In London the role had been split into two Northern Secretary and Southern Secretary. At the Jacobite court in exile, first in Paris and then in Rome, the claimants alternated between having one or two Secretaries of State. From 1689 to 1759 a series of unsuccessful attempts were made to invade Britain which would have restored the Secretaries effective power.

Selected list of holders

See also
 Secretary of State for Scotland
 Secretary of State (Kingdom of Scotland)
 Secretary of State (England)
 Secretary of State (United Kingdom)

References

Bibliography
 Melville, Henry Massue Ruvigny Et Raineval. The Jacobite Peerage, Baronetage, Knightage, and Grants of Honour.  Genealogical Publishing, 2003.
 Miller, Peggy. James. George Allen & Unwin, 1971.
 Szechi, Daniel. 1715: The Great Jacobite Rebellion. Yale University Press, 2006.

Secretary of State